The Big Brother Awards in Finland is the version of the international Privacy International's Big Brother Awards by Electronic Frontier Finland. The purpose of the Big Brother Awards is to draw attention to the violations of privacy that have occurred in society. In year 2008 there were awards in three categories: personal, the government and private sector organization.

In Finland, together with Big Brother Awards, there is also a positive nomination that is named after Winston Smith from George Orwell's book Nineteen Eighty-Four. This award is given to a person who or an organization which has advanced privacy protection and democracy most during the year.

Big Brother Awards in Finland have been recognized in years 2002, 2003, 2005, 2007, 2008, 2010, 2011, 2013 and 2015.

External links
 Finnish Big Brother Awards 2013
 Finnish Big Brother Awards 2011
 Finnish Big Brother Awards 2009
 Finnish Big Brother Awards 2008
 Effin Isoveli-palkinnot Vanhaselle, Nokialle ja Europarlamentille (In Finnish)
 Big Brother 2005 -palkinnot EU:n ministerineuvostolle, juorulehdille, Karpelalle (In Finnish)
 Big Brother 2003 Hotelli Tornissa (In Finnish)
 Isovelipalkinnot jaettiin 15.5.2002 (In Finnish)

Privacy awards
Ironic and humorous awards
Nineteen Eighty-Four